Sven Epiney (born on 14 January 1972 in Naters, Switzerland) is a Swiss TV presenter, radio host and editor, who works for Swiss national television and radio SRF. He speaks German, French, English and Italian. Since 2008 he has been the Swiss German commentator for the Eurovision Song Contest. He was the presenter of Miss Switzerland 2010.

References

External links
Sven Epiney Official Website,In German

1972 births
Living people
People from Naters
Swiss television personalities
Swiss-German people
Switzerland in the Eurovision Song Contest
Beauty pageant hosts